The 2005 Virginia lieutenant gubernatorial election resulted in Republican Bill Bolling defeating Democrat Leslie Byrne despite Democrat Tim Kaine's victory in the concurrent gubernatorial election.

Candidates 
 Leslie Byrne (Democratic), former State Senator and United States Representative
 Bill Bolling (Republican), State Senator

Results

References

2005 Virginia elections
Virginia lieutenant gubernatorial elections
Virginia